Robert "Bob" Gasper (born October 1, 1958 in Humboldt, Saskatchewan) is a Canadian luge athlete who competed in doubles luge from the late 1980s to the mid-1990s.

Competing in three Winter Olympics (1988, 1992, 1994), Gasper earned his best finish of eighth (tied with Ukraine) in the men's Luge at the doubles event at Lillehammer, Norway in the 1994 Winter Olympics.

Gasper married Betty Smith in 1988 in Lloydminster, Alberta.  He has two children.

References
1988 luge men's doubles results
1992 luge men's doubles results
1994 luge men's doubles results
Canadian Olympic Committee profile

1958 births
Canadian male lugers
Living people
Lugers at the 1988 Winter Olympics
Lugers at the 1992 Winter Olympics
Lugers at the 1994 Winter Olympics
Sportspeople from Humboldt, Saskatchewan
Sportspeople from Saskatchewan